Sean Patrick Quilty (16 May 1966 – 16 July 2022) was an Australian long-distance runner who competed in the 1996 Summer Olympics.

Competition record

References

External links

1966 births
2022 deaths
Australian male long-distance runners
Olympic athletes of Australia
Athletes (track and field) at the 1996 Summer Olympics
Athletes (track and field) at the 1994 Commonwealth Games
Athletes (track and field) at the 1998 Commonwealth Games
Commonwealth Games medallists in athletics
Commonwealth Games silver medallists for Australia
Medallists at the 1994 Commonwealth Games